Nanda Kyaw (born 3 September 1996) is a Burmese professional footballer who plays as a defender for Shan United F.C. and  Myanmar national football team. He was the captain of Myanmar U-20 National Football Team played in 2015 FIFA U-20 World Cup. Nanda Kyaw won 1st runner-up of 2013 MNL Youth League's Best Player Award.

Career
He was born in Amarapura Township, Manadalay State. He played football since he was 10. In 2012, he reached to Magway Youth Club.

International

Honours

Club
Magwe
 General Aung San Shield: 2016

Shan United
 Myanmar National League: 2017, 2019, 2020, 2022
 General Aung San Shield: 2017; runners-up: 2019

International
Myanmar U20
 Hassanal Bolkiah Trophy: 2014

References

1996 births
Living people
People from Mandalay Region
Burmese footballers
Myanmar international footballers
Association football fullbacks
Magway FC players
Footballers at the 2018 Asian Games
Competitors at the 2017 Southeast Asian Games
Asian Games competitors for Myanmar
Southeast Asian Games competitors for Myanmar